Ron Schallenberg (born 6 October 1998) is a German professional footballer who plays as a midfielder for  club SC Paderborn.

Career
Schallenberg made his debut for SC Paderborn in the first round of the 2020–21 DFB-Pokal on 13 September 2020, coming on as a substitute in the 36th minute for Sebastian Vasiliadis against fourth-division side SC Wiedenbrück, which finished as a 5–0 away win. He made his 2. Bundesliga debut for the club on 28 September 2020, coming on as a substitute in the 73rd minute for Julian Justvan against Hamburger SV, which finished as a 4–3 home loss.

References

External links
 
 
 
 Ron Schallenberg at nordbayern.de

1998 births
Living people
Sportspeople from Paderborn
Footballers from North Rhine-Westphalia
German footballers
Association football midfielders
SC Paderborn 07 players
SC Paderborn 07 II players
SC Verl players
2. Bundesliga players
Regionalliga players